Kvæfjord Church is a parish church of the Church of Norway in Kvæfjord Municipality in Troms og Finnmark county, Norway. It is located in the village of Borkenes on the island of Hinnøya. It is the main church for the Kvæfjord parish which is part of the Trondenes prosti (deanery) in the Diocese of Nord-Hålogaland. The white, wooden, neo-gothic church was built in a long church style in 1867 using plans drawn up by the architect Jacob Wilhelm Nordan. The church seats about 550 people. The building was consecrated on 30 July 1867.

History
The earliest existing historical records of the church date back to the year 1350, but the church was likely built around the year 1250. It is not known how many buildings stood on the site over the centuries, but in 1750, the Bishop Frederik Nannestad wrote that the Kvæfjord Church was a red, wooden, cruciform church. In 1764-1765 the old church was torn down and a new church was built on the same site. It was a timber-framed church in a cruciform design. It had a small tower over the central part of the building with an extended choir and sacristy in the east.

In 1814, this church served as an election church. Together with more than 300 other parish churches across Norway, it was a polling station for elections to the 1814 Norwegian Constituent Assembly which wrote the Constitution of Norway. This was Norway's first national elections. Each church parish was a constituency that elected people called "electors" who later met together in each county to elect the representatives for the assembly that was to meet in Eidsvoll later that year.

That church only lasted about 120 years before it was too small for the parish, so in 1866-1867 it was torn down and replaced with the present church. The cost for the new church was 5,565 speciedaler, 1 ort, and 10 skilling. The new building was a long church with a narrower, rectangular choir and sacristy built to the east, as well as a tower next to the nave to the west.

See also
List of churches in Nord-Hålogaland

References

Kvæfjord
Churches in Troms
Wooden churches in Norway
19th-century Church of Norway church buildings
Churches completed in 1867
13th-century establishments in Norway
Norwegian election church
Long churches in Norway